Rushup Edge is a ridge in the Derbyshire Peak District of England.

Lord's Seat is the site of a round barrow.

Geology 
Rushup Edge is part of the ridge which extends east to Mam Tor, Hollins Cross, Back Tor and Lose Hill, separating the Edale and Hope valleys. The ridge is formed of Namurian (c320mya) age Mam Tor Beds (alternating sandstone and siltstone) and landslides on the north have formed colluvium.

Protest
In October 2014, mountain bikers, walkers, horse riders, climbers and conservationists held a protest against Derbyshire County Council maintenance work on the byway that runs along Rushup Edge. They were upset at the insensitive nature of the work, the cost, the environmental impact and the apparent lack of consultation with them before works began. Derbyshire County Council halted the work to speak with protesters in December 2014.

See also
 Rushop, also known as Rushup, a nearby village

References

External links 
 Geograph 1:50,000 map and photos

Mountains and hills of Derbyshire
Mountains and hills of the Peak District
Ridges of England